Liu Min may refer to:

Liu Min (劉敏), official and calligrapher of the Shu Han state in the Three Kingdoms period of China
Liu Chong (895–954), founder of the Northern Han dynasty of China, later changed his name to Liu Min (劉旻)
Liu Min (dancer) (刘敏) (born 1958), Chinese military dancer